Flenniken is a surname. Notable people with this surname include:

 Kathleen Flenniken (born 1960), American writer, poet, editor, and educator
 Mack Flenniken (1905–1956), American American football player and coach
 Brian Flenniken, member of Mad Caddies
 Shary Flenniken (born 1950), American illustrator